Krivchenkov is a Russian masculine surname, its feminine counterpart is Krivchenkova. It may refer to
Alexei Krivchenkov (born 1974), Russian ice hockey defenceman
Vladimir Krivchenkov (1917–1997), Russian physicist

Russian-language surnames